"Stompin' at the Savoy" is a 1933 jazz standard composed by Edgar Sampson. It is named after the famed Harlem nightspot the Savoy Ballroom in New York City.

History and composition
Although the song is often credited to Benny Goodman, Chick Webb, Edgar Sampson, and Andy Razaf, it was written and arranged by Sampson, Rex Stewart's alto saxophonist. Sampson wrote the song when he was with Stewart's orchestra at the Empire Ballroom in 1933. It was used as the band's theme song until the band broke up, after which Sampson joined Chick Webb's band, taking the song with him.  Webb’s recording of rose to number ten on the charts in 1934. Two years later the piece charted by Ozzie Nelson and by Benny Goodman. 

Both Webb and Benny Goodman recorded it as an instrumental, Goodman's being the bigger hit. Lyrics were added by lyricist Andy Razaf.
Goodman's 1936 version is written in 32-bar song form with four 8-bar phrases arranged AABA. The A sections use a Db6, Ab9, Db6, Ddim, Ebm7, Ab7, Db, Db chord sequence. The B section phrases use a Gb9/G9, Gb9, B13/F#m6, B13, E9/F9, E9, A13, Ab13 chord sequence. The tempo is medium fast.

Since becoming a jazz standard, the song has been recorded hundreds of times.

Various versions
 Chick Webb, 1934
 Benny Goodman, 1936
 Judy Garland, 1936
 Charlie Christian, 1941  
 Django Reinhardt, 1944
 Art Tatum, 1941
 Glenn Miller and the AAFB, V-Disc, 1944
 Esquire All Stars, 1944
 Art Tatum, The Art Tatum Solo Masterpieces Volume 5, 1953
 Clifford Brown and Max Roach, Brown and Roach Incorporated, 1954
 Anita O'Day, Pick Yourself Up with Anita O'Day, 1956
 Ella Fitzgerald and Louis Armstrong, 1956
 Art Pepper, Modern Art, 1956
 Louis Armstrong and Ella Fitzgerald, Ella and Louis Again, 1957
 Jim Hall, 1957 
 Ahmad Jamal and Cal Tjader, 1958)  
 Henri Salvador, Salvador plays the blues, 1959
 Ella Fitzgerald  live, on her Ella at the Opera House album, 1960
 Sarah Vaughan, 1964 
 Harry Connick, Jr., When Harry Met Sally..., 1989
 The Boston Pops Orchestra under John Williams, 1991
 Karrin Allyson, Azure-Té, 1995
 Eddie Daniels, Swing Low Sweet Clarinet, 1999
 Nikki Yanofsky with Herbie Hancock and will.i.am, 2007 
 Tony Glausi, My Favorite Tunes, 2020

See also
List of jazz standards (1930s)

Notes

References

External links
"Stompin' at the Savoy" Jazz guitar arrangement

1934 songs
1930s jazz standards
Songs written by Andy Razaf
Songs written by Edgar Sampson
Benny Goodman songs
Al Hirt songs
Jazz songs
Jazz compositions in C major